An Esquire Bedell is a junior ceremonial officer of a university, usually with official duties relating to the conduct of ceremonies for the conferment of degrees. The word is closely related to the archaic bedel and modern English beadle.

History
The University of Cambridge historically had a beadle (usher) assisting with official ceremonies as well as being an administrative assistant of the chancellor and the proctors. The title of Gentleman Bedell, similar in status to a Gentleman Usher, was in use by 1392. The title Esquire Bedell was first used in 1473 and formally recognised in the university statutes by Edward VI in 1549.

The principal bedell was assisted in both administrative and ceremonial duties by a secondary or sub-bedell. By the 15th century this position was given the somewhat demeaning title of "inferior bedell", but granted the title of Yeoman Bedell by Edward VI in 1549. Yeomen at the time were often constables and bailiffs. A Yeoman Bedell performed similar duties at the university, including collecting fines at the time when universities had their own jurisdiction over students. The Yeoman Bedell could also perform the duties of a crier.

By country
Esquires Bedell are primarily associated with universities in the United Kingdom.

In Australia, the Australian National University, the University of Melbourne, the University of Sydney, the University of New England, Monash University and others retain the position of Esquire Bedell, sometimes assisted by a Yeoman Bedell. These are largely administrative positions, although performing the traditional duties of a bedell for graduation ceremonies.

In New Zealand, the University of Auckland has Esquires Bedell.

See also
 Beadle
 Bedel

References

Further reading
"Esquire Bedell", Cambridge University
"Bedells", Janus, Cambridge University
Image of the academic dress of the Esquire Bedell, University of Southampton
Henry Paine Stokes, The esquire bedells of the University of Cambridge from the 13th century to the 20th century. Cambridge, Printed for the Cambridge Antiquarian Society; sold by Deighton, Bell & Co., 1911.

Academic honours